Cadiz is a home rule-class city and the county seat of Trigg County, Kentucky, United States. The population was 2,540 at the 2020 census. It is part of the Clarksville metropolitan area.

Cadiz is a historic town located close to the Land Between the Lakes, a popular recreation area. It was a base of Union and Confederate operations during the Civil War. It permits the sale of alcoholic beverages.

Etymology
William Henry Perrin's 1884 History of Trigg County does not explain the origin of Spanish name of the town. In May 1820 the county commission chose to use Robert Baker's land as the site of the county seat. He relinquished his stable yard and the surrounding . From August to October, the commission platted the town in blocks and named it as Cadiz. Rennick's Kentucky Place Names repeats the local tradition that a Spaniard in the surveying party successfully suggested his hometown. The book also states that "It was definitely not named for the city in Ohio."  The name, however, does not take the Spanish pronunciation.

Geography
Cadiz is located at  (36.867781, -87.817374).

Demographics

As of the census of 2010, there were 2,558 people, 1,541 households, and 648 families residing in the city. The racial makeup of the city was 79.2% White, 17.2% African American, 0.13% Native American, 0.66% Asian, 0.04% Pacific Islander, 0.39% from other races, and 2.3% from two or more races. Hispanic or Latino of any race were 0.98% of the population.

There were 1,541 households, out of which 30.1% had children under the age of 18 living with them, 44.5% were married couples living together, 15.8% had a female householder with no husband present, and 35.7% were non-families. 32.9% of all households were made up of individuals, and 18.7% had someone living alone who was 65 years of age or older. The average household size was 2.29 and the average family size was 2.89.

In the city, the population was spread out, with 25.4% under the age of 18, 8.0% from 18 to 24, 24.9% from 25 to 44, 21.8% from 45 to 64, and 20.7% who were 65 years of age or older. The median age was 39 years. For every 100 females, there were 82.5 males. For every 100 females age 18 and over, there were 77.9 males.

The median income for a household in the city was $29,872, and the median income for a family was $37,736. Males had a median income of $30,357 versus $18,929 for females. The per capita income for the city was $13,404. About 17.5% of families and 19.9% of the population were below the poverty line, including 29.2% of those under age 18 and 18.7% of those age 65 or over.

Notable people
 Coy Bacon, NFL player
 Joe Bolton, poet
 John Egerton, journalist  
 Boots Randolph, musician
 Charles Tyler, musician
 Roger Vinson, U.S. District Court judge

Crime

Cadiz boasts one of the lowest crime rates in Kentucky. The total crime risk index score for Cadiz is 34, which is 37 points below the statewide crime risk score of 71 and 66 points below the national crime risk score of 100.

Schools
Public education in Cadiz is operated by Trigg County Public School District. It operates a single campus on Main Street.

Cadiz also operates the public John L. Street Library.

Climate
Cadiz has a humid climate and four distinct seasons. The warmest month of the year is July, with an average high temperature of 90 °F. The coldest month is January, with an average high temperature of 44 °F.

References

External links
 cadiz.ky.gov - Official website
 Tourism website - gocadiz.com

Cities in Kentucky
Cities in Trigg County, Kentucky
County seats in Kentucky
Clarksville metropolitan area
1820 establishments in Kentucky
Populated places established in 1820